The Last of Robin Hood is a 2013 American independent biographical drama film about actor Errol Flynn written and directed by Richard Glatzer and Wash Westmoreland. The film stars Kevin Kline, Dakota Fanning, Susan Sarandon, Matthew Kane, and Max Casella. It was screened in the Special Presentation section at the 2013 Toronto International Film Festival.

Cast 
 Kevin Kline as Errol Flynn
 Dakota Fanning as Beverly Aadland
 Susan Sarandon as Florence Aadland
 Patrick St. Esprit as Herb Aadland
 Matthew Kane as Ronnie Shedlo
 Max Casella as Stanley Kubrick
 Sean Flynn as Grip (Sean Flynn is the real-life grandson of Errol Flynn)
 Bryan Batt as Orry-Kelly
 Jane McNeill as Cynthia Gould
 Ric Reitz as Melvin Belli 
 Jackie Prucha as Hedda Hopper
 Peter Belsito as Barry Mahon
 Joe Knezevich as John Ireland
 Ben Winchell as Jack

Production 
Killer Films set Richard Glatzer and Wash West to write and direct the upcoming true-story-based biographical film about legendary actor Errol Flynn. By April 9, 2014, Samuel Goldwyn Films had acquired the US distribution rights to the film.

Casting 
On October 10, 2012, it was in the news that Kevin Kline and Susan Sarandon had signed on to star in the true-story-based biographical film. Kline would play the role of Errol Flynn, a legendary actor who was in a relationship with a 17-year-old girl, Beverly Aadland, and Sarandon would play Florence Aadland, Beverly Aadland's stage mother. On January 23, 2013, Dakota Fanning was added to the cast to play the role of Beverly Aadland, Flynn's teenage girlfriend. Patrick St. Esprit also joined the cast to play Herb Aadland, a down-to-earth engineer and Beverly Aadland's father.

Filming 
The filming of The Last of Robin Hood began in the end of January 2013 in Atlanta, Georgia.

Reception 
On review aggregator website Rotten Tomatoes, it has a score of 28% based on 65 reviews. The website's critical consensus reads "Kevin Kline's performance is spot on, but in every other respect, The Last of Robin Hood disappoints." Dakota Fanning was called miscast by several critics.

Marketing 
On June 24, 2014, the first trailer of the film was released.

References

External links 
 
 
 

2013 films
2013 biographical drama films
American biographical drama films
Films about actors
Drama films based on actual events
Films set in the 1950s
Films shot in Atlanta
Films directed by Wash West
Films produced by Christine Vachon
Killer Films films
Samuel Goldwyn Films films
2013 drama films
Biographical films about actors
2010s English-language films
2010s American films